"Gimme Some More" is a 1971 song written by James Brown and recorded by his band, The J.B.'s. Released as a single on People Records, "Gimme Some More" also appeared on the 1972 album Food for Thought.

A 1972 live performance of "Gimme Some More" is included on The J.B.'s' 1995 compilation album Funky Good Time: The Anthology. Additionally, the song was reworked by Brown into "Happy For The Poor" for the soundtrack of the 1973 blaxpoitation film Slaughter's Big Rip-off.

Background
The song's lyrics consist solely of the song title, chanted by the whole band throughout the record.

Personnel
Credits per liner notes by Alan Leeds.
Jerone "Jasaan" Sanford – trumpet
Russell Crimes – trumpet
Isiah "Ike" Oakley – trumpet
Fred Wesley – trombone
Jimmy Parker  – alto saxophone
St. Clair Pinckney – tenor saxophone
Bobby Byrd – organ, tambourine
Robert Coleman – guitar
Hearlon "Cheese" Martin – guitar
Fred Thomas – bass
John "Jabo" Starks – drums
The entire band – vocals

Chart performance
"Gimme Some More" charted No. 11 R&B and No. 67 Pop.

References

The J.B.'s songs
Songs written by James Brown
1971 singles
1971 songs